Beamsville in an unincorporated community in central Richland Township, Darke County, Ohio, United States. It lies near the intersection of U.S. Route 127 and the Stillwater River, approximately 6 miles north of Greenville, the county seat of Darke County.

History
Beamsville was laid out in 1837 by John Beam, and named for him. A post office was established at Beamsville in 1839, and remained in operation until 1905.

Notes
The original lyrics sheet to the Rush song Rivendell on Fly By Night mentions that the song was written in Beamsville.

References

Unincorporated communities in Darke County, Ohio
Unincorporated communities in Ohio